Arthur Dobson (22 February 1854 – 17 September 1932) was an English first-class cricketer, who played two matches for Yorkshire in 1879, against the Marylebone Cricket Club (MCC) and Surrey.  A right-handed batsman and right arm medium pacer, he scored one run in his three innings, and did not get a bowl.

Born in Ilkley, Yorkshire, England, Dobson died in September 1932 in Horsforth, Leeds, Yorkshire.

References

External links
Cricket Archive
Cricinfo

1854 births
1932 deaths
Yorkshire cricketers
English cricketers
People from Ilkley
Cricketers from Yorkshire